Linda Varilis (née Henry; born 24 August 1959) is an English actress. She is known for her roles as Yvonne Atkins in the ITV drama Bad Girls and Shirley Carter in the BBC soap opera EastEnders, a role she has played since 2006. She had previously appeared in EastEnders as the original Lorraine Salter, the mother of Mandy Salter (Nicola Stapleton) from 1991 to 1992. Her other acting credits include Cracker (1995), Prime Suspect (1997) and Trial & Retribution (1998). She has also appeared in the films Beautiful Thing (1996) and The Business (2005).

Early life 
Henry was born on 24 August 1959 and was brought up in Peckham, London. She spent some time with the Old Vic Youth Theatre, and at seventeen she went to the Webber Douglas Academy of Dramatic Art. Henry later set up a production company, Buster, which still exists although she is no longer involved with it.

Career 
As well as her role in Bad Girls she is also remembered for her role as Sandra in the film Beautiful Thing and has appeared in the British television programmes  The Bill, Birds of a Feather, Touching Evil, Cracker, A Touch of Frost, Trial & Retribution as Marilyn Spark and EastEnders, where she played Lorraine Salter, the prostitute mother of the teenage tearaway Mandy Salter (Nicola Stapleton).

She had a minor role in British film The Business as the character Shirley, which also starred Danny Dyer as the main character.

On 8 September 2006 it was announced Henry would be returning to EastEnders in a different role, this time playing Shirley Carter, mother to Carly (Kellie Shirley) and Deano (Matt Di Angelo) and ex-wife of Kevin (Phil Daniels).

Shirley arrived in Walford in December 2006. Henry took part in the 2008 "WestEnders" Children in Need appeal where she sang alongside other EastEnders cast members. She is close friends with co-star Cheryl Fergison, who played her on-screen best friend Heather Trott. She also took part in a 2008 EastEnders edition of The Weakest Link and appears in the 2010 spin-off series EastEnders: E20.

Personal life
Henry married Stavros Valiris ​in 1992. Their daughter was born in 1993.

In 2014, she was arrested for racially aggravated harassment. Henry pleaded not guilty and stood trial on 11 February 2015 at Bexley Magistrates Court in south London. She was later cleared of all charges.

Filmography

Awards and nominations

References

External links
 
 

1959 births
Living people
English film actresses
English television actresses
English soap opera actresses
Alumni of the Webber Douglas Academy of Dramatic Art